1959's New South Wales Rugby Football League premiership was the 52nd season of the rugby league competition based in Sydney. Ten teams from across the city competed for the J. J. Giltinan Shield during the season, which culminated in a grand final between St. George and Manly-Warringah.

Season summary 
The St. George team went through the 1959 season undefeated – a feat achieved by five teams prior to 1959 but by none since. The club won nineteen of their twenty matches and played a draw against Balmain. They were able to score more than forty points on six occasions.  After eighteen premiership rounds St. George had scored an average of over thirty points per match and conceded an average of ten points.

Future Immortals Reg Gasnier and Johnny Raper both debuted for St. George in first grade in 1959 and both made the Australian side, aged just 19. Seven St. George players made that year's Kangaroo Tour.

The 1959 season also saw the retirement from the League of future Australian Rugby League Hall of Fame inductee, Harry Bath.

Teams

Regular season

Bold – Home game
X – Bye
Opponent for round listed above margin

Ladder

Ladder progression

Numbers highlighted in green indicate that the team finished the round inside the top 4.
Numbers highlighted in blue indicates the team finished first on the ladder in that round.
Numbers highlighted in red indicates the team finished last place on the ladder in that round.

Finals

Grand Final

In the lead up to the Grand Final, rumours were circulating that Manly-Warringah's Rex Mossop was carrying a broken cheekbone. From the kick off, Saints' forwards took turns at testing Mossop's injury with Harry Bath giving him particular attention. For most of the match the Manly forward copped a hammering until in frustration, Mossop retaliated by standing on Bath's head. A brawl broke out between the two and the referee Lawler sent both off.

In the meantime, St. George's forwards were steamrolling Manly-Warringah and the red and white backs were cutting loose. Winger Eddie Lumsden had a magnificent match, scoring a hat trick of tries. Lumsden beat Ron Willey cold for his first try and then was on the end of later backline passing bursts for two more.

As the Manly-Warringah pack tired in the second half, experienced St. George second rower Norm Provan began to easily break their defence out wide, linking with his backs and being rewarded himself with a try. Reserve grade  Geoff Weekes had been promoted when Gasnier and Johnny Riley were both injured in the major semi final. He scored a try as did St. George's steady and safe custodian Brian Graham.

St. George outclassed Manly-Warringah 20–0 in a ruthless display of speed and strength. The match was future Australian Rugby League Hall of Fame inductee Harry Bath's last game.

St. George 20 (Tries: Lumsden 3, Graham, Weekes, N Provan. Goals: Bath 1.)

Manly-Warringah 0

Player statistics
The following statistics are as of the conclusion of Round 18.

Top 5 point scorers

Top 5 try scorers

Top 5 goal scorers

References

External links
 Rugby League Tables - Season 1959 The World of Rugby League
 Writer, Larry (1995) Never Before, Never Again, Pan MacMillan, Sydney
 Results: 1951-60 at rabbitohs.com.au
 1959 J J Giltinan Shield at rleague.com
 NSWRFL season 1959 at rugbyleagueproject.com
1959 Final at Dragons History site

New South Wales Rugby League premiership
Nswrfl season